Sepura Limited is a British telecommunications equipment provider that develops and supplies radio terminals, accessories and software applications for business and mission critical communications. The company specialises in Terrestrial Trunked Radio (TETRA) and LTE (telecommunication) technology.

Headquartered in Cambridge, UK, Sepura has partners supplying the Professional mobile radio market in many countries. Sepura products are used in public safety (including police, fire service and ambulance), public transport, commercial and military sectors.

History 
Sepura's origins are in the Pye company, founded in Cambridge in 1896. William Pye, a trained instrument maker working at Cambridge University Cavendish Laboratory, set up his own business making high precision scientific instruments. He soon built up an international customer base and a reputation for high quality products.

During the First World War the company began developing and manufacturing military equipment, but after 1921, business began to slow and Pye turned its attention to designing the first commercially successful radio – the ‘700 series’.

Pye also had an interest in television, and in 1930 started developing TV sets and cathode ray tubes. The high point of Pye pre-World War II TV development came with the introduction of the Model 915 TV receiver. By 1939, a full-scale production line had been set up in Cambridge.

With the arrival of the Second World War, UK TV broadcasting was suspended, and the production of the 45 MHz Pye Model 915 TV receiver ceased. Pye then turned its attention to designing and producing radar and wireless equipment for the British Military.

As a developer and manufacturer, Pye produced:

	Domestic radios (1924)
	Televisions (1935)
	Military radios (1939)
	Car radios (1947)
	Police radios (1949)

The mobile radio division of the company, Pye Telecommunications, was taken over by Philips in 1966. By the mid-1990s Philips had decided to pull out of non-core business areas and in 1996 Simoco acquired the Philips PMR business. Sepura was founded in 2002 when it acquired the assets of the TETRA radio business from Simoco.

The following decade saw the TETRA standard gradually adopted, while Sepura saw its business expand from its core UK-based public safety organisations to an international market including oil and gas, transport markets, utilities and mining.

Sepura was listed on the London Stock Exchange in 2007 and in 2012, the year of its 10th anniversary, the company announced that it had shipped its millionth radio. In the same year, it acquired Austrian infrastructure provider 3T Communications (now Sepura Systems).

In 2013, the company acquired Helsinki-based applications developer, Portalify and launched a range of Digital Mobile Radio (DMR) products, covering UHF and VHF frequency bands. The following year, Sepura acquired Fylde Micro, pioneers in radio trunking, enabling DMR Tier III to be offered as part of their portfolio. 2015 saw the acquisition of Teltronic, a Professional Mobile Radio company, based in Zaragoza, Spain.

In 2016 Sepura ran into financial trouble resultant from the acquisition of Teltronic and alleged delay of expected orders. The company incurred a considerable amount of debt following its acquisition of Teltronic. Net debt rose from just 1.1 Million Pounds in 2015 to 119.4 Million Pounds at the end of the 2016 Financial year - additionally Sepura posted a pre tax 19 Million Pound loss for the same period.

Based on the financial issues, Sepura withdrew its DMR range of radios citing at the 2016 AGM "that the board now believes it will not be possible to achieve further market penetration without significant additional investment."

Sepura's share price on the London Stock Exchange subsequently lost 95% of its value, dropping from 200 pence to a low of just 9.7 pence in a 3-month period between July 2016 and September 2016.

Hytera, a Chinese Radio manufacturer, then entered into talks and due diligence to take over the company in November 2016.

On the 16 December 2016, the Sepura board recommended the shareholders accept a bid of 20 pence per share from Hytera as a cash purchase.

In July 2022, London-based private equity group Epiris acquired Sepura.

Ofcom, Britain's regulator for UK communications industries, in December 2022 fined Sepura £1.5m for a breach of competition law. In 2018 Sepura and Motorola were in competition for a contract to extend the Airwave digital radio system for police, fire and ambulance services. The regulator found that employees of both companies had exchanged text messages about pricing strategy and likely pricing levels for the new contract.

Acquisitions

2012 

3T Communications, an Austrian infrastructure provider

2013 

Portalify OY, a Finnish applications developer

2014 

Fylde Micro Ltd, a UK-based trunk radio, voice and data systems provider

2015 

Teltronic S.A.U., a Spanish Professional Mobile Radio (PMR) company

Products

The SRP Series 

Sepura's first TETRA radio was the SRP2000. This set new benchmarks in the industry as it was much smaller and lighter than anything that had gone before.

Developed at a time when the UK Police were going through a uniform re-design, Sepura listened carefully to police users’ requirements to develop a functional secure communications device that was fit-for-purpose. As a result, by mid-2004, the SRP2000 held a remarkable 90% of market share (Radio Comms News, 2012) among UK-based police users.

The SRP2000 resembled a GSM phone of the day, rather than a traditional portable radio and, for the first time, it was a radio designed to be worn on the user's lapel rather than on the belt.

This was significant, because a lapel-worn radio negated the need for a remote speaker microphone and removed a sizeable weight from the user's belt – a factor which was thought to contribute to lumbar strain and a significant number of absences from work.

In 2005, Sepura partnered with QinetiQ to deploy the first use of Super Sensitive GPS for TETRA users, known as sGPS. This move saw the SRP series updated to become the SRH series.

The SRH Series 

(SRH3500, SRH3800, SRH3900)
The SRH3500 was, in many ways, a groundbreaking TETRA radio on account of its diminutive dimensions; it remains one of the smallest and lightest TETRA radios ever to be put in mass production. Together with its sister radio, the SRH3800, it was adopted by police, ambulance and fire and rescue services worldwide.

The radios’ popularity within the ‘blue light’ community meant that Sepura was frequently asked to supply dummy radios to film and TV production crews around the world, to add to the authenticity of their productions. As a result, Sepura radios have made appearances on well-known programmes such as Eastenders and Coronation Street, as well as crime re-enactments and real life ‘police action’ documentaries.

The STP8000 Series 

(STP8000, STP8100, STP8200)
Climate change was one of the key drivers behind Sepura's next launch, the STP8000 series. Launched in 2008, it was designed to cope with heavy downpours – rather than light showers, as had previously been the accepted industry standard.

The 8000 series was designed to cope with the needs of the search and rescue users in the jungles of Malaysia; frozen winters experienced by Swedish Police and fire services; and downpours and floods that were occurring in many parts of the world.

The STP8000 was the start of Sepura's new genre of tough, go-anywhere TETRA radios, that not only appealed to the world's emergency services, but gained a whole new range of users, keen to take advantage of its ruggedness.

As a result, the STP8000 was complemented by the STP8100 (launched 2009) and STP8200 (launched 2010), designed for use in the mines of Australia and oil and gas installations around the globe.

SRG3900
Launched in 2010, the SRG3900 was a popular addition to Sepura's range, providing 10 watts of RF power, and gateway and repeater technology to extend communication into areas otherwise beyond network coverage. It had the greatest operational range of any TETRA terminal on the contemporary market and was deployed everywhere from ski resorts to mines and chemical parks.

It was launched in conjunction with the Sepura Colour Console (SCC), whose large, high-resolution colour screen allowed the display of high quality photographs and maps.

The STP9000 Series 

(STP9000, STP9100, STP9200)
In 2011, during trials for the London Olympics, TETRA radios were exposed to salt-laden environments, which were seen to quickly cause corrosion to connectors. In response to this and other new challenges, the STP9000 series drew on the ‘tough technology’ developed for the STP8X and went one step further, being designed to be not just waterproof, but fully submersible. It was resistant to heavy salt mist and included a new ‘Connector Protector’ technology that guarded it against direct exposure to salt water.

The STP9000 was also the first TETRA radio to feature Haptic Technology, significantly improving its key response for users working in heavy gloves.

The STP8X Series 

(STP8X000, STP8X100)
As a result of this new user base, demand for an Intrinsically Safe variant of the STP8000 was growing. In March 2011 the STP8X100 series, Sepura's first Intrinsically Safe radio, was launched.

Certified by Baseefa to version 6 of the IECEx and ATEX standards the STP8X100 series exceeded the requirements of the rigorous highly accelerated life test stipulated by the specifications: one month held at 85 °C and 90% humidity followed by one day at −25 °C to −30 °C, before being impact tested, drop tested, water-ingress tested and finally vacuum-assisted dust-ingress tested in a chamber for two hours.

The SC Series 
Launched in May 2015, the SC20 was promoted as ‘The next generation’ of hand-portable radios, offering optional high-speed data connectivity, connectivity to body-worn data accessories and a Linux operating system to enable a wider applications capability. Submersible, waterproof and dustproof, SC20 radios passed IP66, IP67 and IP68 environmental protection ratings and were designed with an easy-clean design, allowing them to be rinsed in running water.

In May 2017, the more compact SC21 hand-held radio launched offering the same functionality as the SC20 but in a smaller radio terminal.

In June 2019, the SCG22 mobile radio was launched.

In June 2022 to enable more mining users to use Sepura TETRA radios, the SC20, SC21 and SCG22 were also made available in VHF, operating within 136-174MHz.

The SCU3 Broadband Vehicle Device 

The first of Sepura's mission critical LTE products, the SCU3 Broadband Vehicle Device was launched at Critical Communications World Conference and Exhibition in November, 2021. Designed to provide both mission critical voice and access to high speed data, the SCU3 was built on an Android operating system, supporting Bluetooth, Wi-Fi and Ethernet to provide connections to a wide range of accessories, apps and systems. 

The SCU3 received certification from the Global Certification Forum(GCF) in February 2022, meeting the GCF's technical requirements for interoperability of wireless devices.

It also offers an optional TETRA Module, supporting Direct Mode in the 380-473MHz band for users wanted to use both TETRA and LTE networks.

References 

Electronics companies of the United Kingdom
Companies based in Cambridge